Patrick Layton Paulsen (July 6, 1927 – April 25, 1997) was an American comedian and satirist notable for his roles on several of the Smothers Brothers television shows, and for his satirical campaigns for President of the United States between 1968 and 1996.

Early life and education
Paulsen was born July 6, 1927, in South Bend, Washington, a small fishing town in Pacific County. He was the son of Beulah Inez (née Fadden) and Norman Inge Paulsen, a Norwegian immigrant who worked for the Coast Guard. The family moved to California when he was 10, where he graduated from Tamalpais High School in Mill Valley in May 1945.

Paulsen joined the Marine Corps after high school, when World War II was still being waged, but it ended before he was shipped overseas. However, he did experience overseas duty, including guarding captured Japanese soldiers during their repatriation. He returned home after the war and worked as a posting clerk, a truck driver, a hod carrier, a Fuller Brush salesman, and a gypsum miner. Later, he was employed as a photostat operator for several years. He attended San Francisco City College, then joined an acting group called "The Ric-y-tic Players," and he formed a comedy trio that included his brother Lorin.

Career in comedy

Paulsen developed a solo act, appearing as a comedic guitarist in various clubs on the West Coast and in New York City. He met the Smothers Brothers during an appearance in San Francisco. The Smothers Brothers Comedy Hour premiered in 1967, and Paulsen said that he was hired because he sold them inexpensive songs and would run errands. At first, he was cast as their editorialist, but his deadpan, double-talk comments on the issues of the day propelled him into the national spotlight. His work on The Smothers Brothers' Comedy Hour earned him an Emmy Award in 1968.

Paulsen made a guest appearance on The Monkees in the 1968 episode "Monkees Watch Their Feet", playing the Secretary of National Defense. He also made many appearances on The Tonight Show Starring Johnny Carson. In 1968, he appeared as timid Federal Agent Bosley Cranston in "The Night of the Camera" in Season 4 of The Wild Wild West. During the inaugural season of Sesame Street in 1969–1970, he appeared in a series of comic skits. He was featured in the 1970 Get Smart episode "The Mess of Adrian Listenger". Early in 1970, he headlined his own series Pat Paulsen's Half a Comedy Hour, which ran 13 weeks on ABC. Guests on the first show were former Vice President Hubert Humphrey and an animated Daffy Duck, whom Paulsen interviewed.

In 1971, Paulsen performed in the play Play It Again, Sam at Cherry County Playhouse  in Traverse City, Michigan. He enjoyed this professional summer-stock theater so much that he became business partners in 1976 with television writer and producer Neil Rosen and bought Cherry County Playhouse. He starred in a production every summer except 1973, all the way through the 1995 season. He starred in 24 different plays, including The Fantasticks, The Odd Couple, Harvey, and The Sunshine Boys. He appeared in nightclubs, theaters, and conventions throughout the country. In 1984, he co-starred in the film Night Patrol, a vehicle for The Unknown Comic.

Political campaigns
After CBS sold five minutes of airtime on The Smothers Brothers Comedy Hour for a political ad, the show's writers came up with a bit in which Paulsen disclaimed association with the ad and stating that the ad was unfair to him as a candidate. CBS refused to air the bit, but the incident became the impetus for the Smothers Brothers writers launching a Pat Paulsen presidential campaign. His campaign in 1968 and succeeding years was grounded in comedy, although not without serious commentary. He ran the supposed campaigns using obvious lies, double talk, and tongue-in-cheek attacks on the major candidates, and he responded to all criticism with his catchphrase "Picky, picky, picky." His campaign slogans included, "Just a common, ordinary, simple savior of America's destiny,” “We’ve upped our standards, now up yours,” and, “United we sit.” He gave essentially the same answer to every question on social issues: "To get to the meat of the matter, I will come right to the point, and take note of the fact that the heart of the issue in the final analysis escapes me." In announcing his candidacy on the Smothers Brothers show, Paulsen said, “Now I ask you: Will I solve our economic problems? Will I ease the causes of racial tension? Will I bring a peaceful end to Vietnam? Sure, why not?”

Paulsen's name appeared on the ballot in New Hampshire for the Democratic primary several times. In 1996, he received 921 votes (one percent) to finish second to President Bill Clinton (76,754 votes); this was ahead of real politicians such as Buffalo mayor James D. Griffin. In 1992, he came in second to George Bush in the North Dakota Republican primary. In the 1992 Republican Party primaries, he received 10,984 votes total.

Winemaking

In 1971, Paulsen and his wife opened Pat Paulsen Vineyards, a vineyard and winemaking operation in Sonoma County, California. Shortly after Clint Eastwood was elected mayor of Carmel, California (1986), Paulsen proclaimed himself "mayor" of Asti, the small town near his vineyard. The office was of his own invention.

Personal life and death
In the 1980s, Paulsen began a relationship with social worker Linda Chaney, whom he met at a Denver comedy club. She began serving as his booking agent, and the two were married in 1988. However, he learned that she was diverting his funds into her own personal accounts, and he filed for divorce after only 40 days. He later sued her and was awarded a judgment of $233,000, but Chaney said that, even if she had the money, she would rather "go out and shred it rather than turn it over" to Paulsen. 

In 1995, Paulsen was diagnosed with colon cancer, and doctors discovered that the cancer had spread to his brain and lymph nodes in 1997. He sought alternative medicine treatment for his cancer in Tijuana, Mexico, and died there from complications of pneumonia and kidney failure on April 25, 1997. Paulsen was fondly remembered by fans who enjoyed his mockery of the entire electoral process. "Whenever I’d walk around with him," Tom Smothers said, "people would yell, 'Hey, Mr. President.'  We miss him."

Filmography

Film

Television

{| class="wikitable sortable"
! Year
! Title
! Role
! class="unsortable" | Notes
|-
| 1965-1966
| The Smothers Brothers Show
| Himself
| 5 episodes
|-
| 1967-1969
| The Smothers Brothers Comedy Hour
| Himself
| 52 episodes
|- 
| 1968
| Pat Paulsen for President
| Himself
| Tv Movie
|-
| 1968
| The Wild Wild West
| Bosley Cranston
| "The Night of the Camera"
|-
| 1969
| The Wonderful World of Pizzazz
| Himself
| Guest 
|-
| 1969
| This is Tom Jones
| Himself
| Episode 12 
|-
| 1970
| Pat Paulsen's Half a Comedy Hour| Himself
| 13 episodes
|-
| 1970
| Get Smart| Ace Weems
| Episode: "The Mess of Adrian Listenger"
|-
| 1970
| Sesame Street| Himself
| 4 episodes
|-
| 1970
| The Smothers Brothers Summer Show| Himself
| 3 episodes
|-
| 1975 
| Joey & Dad| Himself
| 4 episodes
|-
| 1993
| Rugrats| Additional Voices
| 2 episodes
|}

DiscographyPat Paulsen for President (1968)Live at the Ice House (1970)Unzipped (1998)

Bibliography

See also

List of notable brain tumor patients

References

Further reading
 "Pat Paulsen for President!: America's Favorite Also-Ran!" article by Wayne Hicks, Filmfax'' magazine, May–July 2016, number 144 (cover). Filmfax, Inc., Evanston, Illinois USA. Four pages (70–73) with 17 photographs.

 chriscomerradio.com/Archive20/CNRLNTS103096HR2PatPaulsen.mp3 Radio interview last campaign 1996

External links

1927 births
1997 deaths
American actor-politicians
American male comedians
American sketch comedians
20th-century American comedians
United States Marine Corps personnel of World War II
American people of Norwegian descent
City College of San Francisco alumni
Deaths from cancer in Mexico
Deaths from colorectal cancer
Tamalpais High School alumni
United States Marines
Candidates in the 1968 United States presidential election
Candidates in the 1972 United States presidential election
Candidates in the 1980 United States presidential election
Candidates in the 1988 United States presidential election
Candidates in the 1992 United States presidential election
Candidates in the 1996 United States presidential election
20th-century American politicians
People from South Bend, Washington